Carmen Hermosillo (died August 10, 2008), A.K.A. humdog, was a community manager/research analyst, essayist, and poet. A contributor to 2GQ (now New Oregon Arts & Letters), FringeWare Review, wired, and Leonardo, Peter Ludlow's High Noon on the Electronic Frontier, and How to Mutate and Take Over the World, she was a participant in many online communities including early chat rooms and internet forums such as The WELL, BBSs, and later activities such as Second Life.

In 1994 she published a widely influential essay online, "Pandora's Vox: On Community in Cyberspace", in which she argued that the result of computer networks had led to, not a reduction in hierarchy, but actually a commodification of personality and a complex transfer of power and information to companies.

Selected work
"Pandora's Vox: On Community in Cyberspace" (1994)
"Veni Redemptor: The Metallic Masks of God" (1997) 
"The History of the Board Ho" (2004) 
"A rant: Sex in Gaming" (2005)
"Confessions of a Gorean Slave" (2006) 
"Roleplay and the Social Contract in Virtual Worlds" (unfinished)

References

External links

Hermosillo, Margarite (2010). "Zero Dark Thirty: The Last Days of Carmen Hermosillo". The Alphaville Herald. April 25.
Ludlow, Peter (08/15/2008). "Remembering Carmen Hermosillo", AlphavilleHerald.com.

Year of birth missing
2008 deaths
American financial analysts
American women poets
Women Internet pioneers
American women essayists
Women financial analysts
San Jose State University alumni
20th-century American women writers
20th-century American writers
21st-century American women writers
21st-century American essayists